Sphaerodactylus continentalis is a species of lizard in the family Sphaerodactylidae. It is found in Honduras and southern Mexico.

References

Sphaerodactylus
Reptiles of Honduras
Reptiles of Mexico
Reptiles described in 1896
Taxa named by Franz Werner